Ramstadslottet is a mountain of Akershus, in southeastern Norway.

External links
 http://www.peakbagger.com/peak.aspx?pid=8892

Mountains of Viken